The "" is the national anthem of El Salvador. The lyrics were written by General Juan José Cañas in 1856, with music composed by the Italian Juan Aberle in 1879. It was adopted on 15 September 1879 and officially approved on 11 December 1953.

The composition has been likened to "William Tell Overture" by critics.

History

1866 anthem 

In 1866, at the initiative of doctor Francisco Dueñas, who at the time was President of the Republic, the first national anthem of El Salvador was created by Cuban doctor Tomás M. Muñoz, who wrote the lyrics, and Salvadoran musician Rafael Orozco, who composed the music. This national anthem was legally adopted through Executive Agreement of 8 October 1866, being published in the state newspaper El Constitucional No. 31, Volume 2, of 11 October 1866, to be officially released on 24 January 1867.

This anthem was sung until the overthrow of President Dueñas through a coup d'état in 1871.

1879 anthem 
Later, in 1879, at the initiative of then president Rafael Zaldívar, the current National Anthem of El Salvador would be created by Cañas and Aberle as authors of its lyrics and music, respectively.

Through the Executive Agreement of 3 June 1891, published in the Official Gazette No. 128, Volume 30, of 3 June 1891, and General Carlos Ezeta being then president, it was legally adopted, at the initiative of Ezeta, as a new national anthem known under the official name of "El Salvador Libre", which was dedicated to the Salvadoran Armed Forces. The composition of the lyrics and music of this national anthem, which was previously officially released on 2 May 1891, was the responsibility of Italian artist Césare Georgi Vélez.

General Ezeta was overthrown in a coup d'état executed in 1894, and after his fall, the national anthem made by Cañas and Aberle was sung again in 1879, although it lacked official recognition.

Regulation 
All radio and television stations must air the national anthem in accordance to the law and should be played during "Startup" and "Closedown" of every stations.

Lyrics 

The National Anthem of El Salvador is made up of a chorus and three stanzas, although the last two have not been sung for many years, as a full performance can take more than four minutes to complete. However, this custom would only obtain official recognition through Legislative Decree No. 342, of 7 October 1992, published in the Official Gazette No. 223, Volume 317, of 3 December 1992, through the which the Legislative Assembly decided to reform Article 15 of the National Symbols Law, where it was established that the execution of the national anthem must begin with the chorus and end with the first verse. However, it has become very common to only sing the chorus, which is repeated, since it is the strongest musical part of the national anthem.

Spanish original

In Nawat 
On 1 September 2009, during the inauguration of Civic Month in Suchitoto, Cuscatlán, the National Anthem was performed in Nawat by the Doctor Mario Calvo Marroquín School Centre Choir from Izalco, Sonsonate.

Notes

References

External links 
 
 Television sign off by TCS

El Salvador
Spanish-language songs
National symbols of El Salvador
Salvadoran songs
National anthems
National anthem compositions in D major
National anthem compositions in A major